Cluster II may refer to:
Cluster II (spacecraft), a European Space Agency mission
Cluster II (album), an album by German electronic music group Cluster